Raging Sun, Raging Sky (Spanish: Rabioso sol, rabioso cielo) is a 2009 Mexican film, made in 2008, written and directed by Julián Hernández. It is the last film in a trilogy by Hernández that includes A Thousand Clouds of Peace (2003) and Broken Sky (2006). The film usually is over 3 hours long. It won the Teddy Award at the Berlin International Film Festival.

Plot
Two men, Kieri and Ryo, have an unquestioning love for each other. But their mutual devotion is not allowed to last. Ryo is abducted, and Kieri embarks upon a long and difficult journey to find him. Unbeknownst to Kieri, it is "heaven's heart" herself that leads and protects him on his quest. Before Kieri finds his companion, Ryo loses his life. And Kieri, desperate to find his beloved, agrees to sacrifice his body to bring about Ryo's resurrection. When they both die, "heaven's heart" reunites them in death and the two men return to life through myth.

Cast
 Jorge Becerra as Kieri
 Javier Oliván as Tari
 Guillermo Villegas as Ryo
 Giovanna Zacarías as Tatei - (Heart of Sky or corazón del cielo)
 Joaquín Rodríguez as Andrésky
 Juan Carlos Torres as Umberto
 Fabian Storniolo as Sergio
 Harold Torres as Bruno
 Clarissa Rendón as Meche
 Baltimore Beltran as Boxer (or 'Boxeador')
 Rubén Santiago as Jonás
 Rubén Ángel as Boy of the Market (or 'Muchacho del mercado')

Reception
Jay Weissberg from Variety (magazine) states in 2009, "The power of desire has rarely been so ravishingly lensed" but "without dialogue and awash in naked male-on-male couplings", it would be difficult to sell the film to audiences.
Armond White from New York Press on 10 June 2009 noted "[Director] Hernández further develops his ideas on form, romanticism and spirituality. His images are beautiful and intriguing enough to win the popular audience he deserves".

See also
List of lesbian, gay, bisexual or transgender-related films

References

External links
 
 Review of Raging Sun, Raging Sky at the British Film Institute

2009 films
Mexican fantasy films
Mexican LGBT-related films
2009 LGBT-related films
2009 fantasy films
2000s Mexican films